Ásvellir is a sports venue in Hafnarfjörður, Iceland with a gym, pool, basketball court and football field.

Two decades ago in 1996 a company and the Hafnarfjörður council signed an agreement to subsidize the construction of the complex. Finished in 1999, it started to host tournaments in 2000.

Refurbishment
In 2014, the Ásvellir gym part was refurbished by polishing the gym surface, grinding up the floor and inserting the lines again. 
Its roof began to leak in October 2016 seeing that there was a storm.

Ólafssalur
In 2018, a new basketball court in the Ásvellir area was opened. It was named Ólafssalur, in memory of Ólafur Rafnsson, former president of FIBA Europe. Ólafssalur has a capacity of 700.

References

Football venues in Iceland
Sports venues in Iceland
Football in Iceland
Basketball venues in Iceland